Ovidiu (historical name: Canara) is a town situated a few kilometres north of Constanța in Constanța County, Northern Dobruja, Romania. Ovidiu is quite small, with a population of around 12,000, and many wealthy inhabitants of Constanța retire there. It officially became a town in 1989, as a result of the Romanian rural systematization program.

In 1930, the town was renamed Ovidiu after the Roman poet Ovid. He was supposedly buried on a nearby small island (also called Ovidiu) in the Siutghiol Lake.

Administration
The town of Ovidiu administers the villages of Poiana (historical names: Cocoșul - until 1964,  - until 1926) and Culmea. The latter was established in 2011 by legally separating from Ovidiu two territorially distinct communities, Social Group Culmea and Social Group Nazarcea.

Sport
The stadium of FCV Farul Constanța is located in Ovidiu.

Demographics

At the 2011 census, Ovidiu had 11,240 Romanians (91.07%), 3  Hungarians (0.02%), 229 Roma  (1.86%), 3 Germans (0.02%), 358 Turks (2.90%), 396 Tatars (3.21%), 8 Lipovans (0.06%), 36 Aromanians (0.29%), 69 others (0.56%).

Natives
 Marius Leca

Gallery

References

 
Towns in Romania
Populated places in Constanța County
Localities in Northern Dobruja
Aromanian settlements in Romania